Charles Percy (1851 – 10 September 1929) was a British Conservative politician. He was the Member of Parliament (MP) for Tynemouth from 1918 to 1922.

He earlier fought Wansbeck in the January 1910 general election.

References

External links 
 

1851 births
1929 deaths
Conservative Party (UK) MPs for English constituencies
UK MPs 1918–1922